Colobothea is a genus of longhorn beetles of the subfamily Lamiinae.

 Colobothea aleata Bates, 1885
 Colobothea amoena Gahan, 1889
 Colobothea andina Monné, 1993
 Colobothea appendiculata Aurivillius, 1902
 Colobothea assimilis Aurivillius, 1902
 Colobothea berkovi Monné & Monné, 2010
 Colobothea bicuspidata (Latreille, 1811)
 Colobothea biguttata Bates, 1865
 Colobothea bilineata Bates, 1865
 Colobothea bisignata Bates, 1865
 Colobothea bitincta Bates, 1872
 Colobothea boliviana Galileo et al., 2014
 Colobothea brullei Gahan, 1889
 Colobothea caramaschii Monné, 2005
 Colobothea carneola Bates, 1865
 Colobothea cassandra (Dalman, 1823)
 Colobothea centralis Monné, 1993
 Colobothea chemsaki Giesbert, 1979
 Colobothea chontalensis Bates, 1872
 Colobothea cincticornis (Schaller, 1783)
 Colobothea colombiana Monné, 1993
 Colobothea crassa Bates, 1865
 Colobothea decemmaculata Bates, 1865
 Colobothea declivis Aurivillius, 1902
 Colobothea delicata Monné, 2005
 Colobothea denotata Monné, 2005
 Colobothea destituta Bates, 1865
 Colobothea discicollis Gahan, 1889
 Colobothea dispersa Bates, 1872
 Colobothea distincta Pascoe, 1866
 Colobothea elongata Gahan, 1889
 Colobothea emarginata (Olivier, 1795)
 Colobothea erythrophthalma (Voet, 1806)
 Colobothea eximia Aurivillius, 1902
 Colobothea fasciata Bates, 1865
 Colobothea fasciatipennis Linsley, 1935
 Colobothea femorosa Erichson, 1847
 Colobothea fibrosa Erichson, 1847
 Colobothea flavimacula (Voet, 1806)
 Colobothea flavoguttata Aurivillius, 1902
 Colobothea flavomaculata Bates, 1865
 Colobothea forcipata Bates, 1865
 Colobothea geminata Bates, 1865
 Colobothea grisescens Zajciw, 1962
 Colobothea guatemalena Bates, 1881
 Colobothea guttulata Aurivillius, 1902
 Colobothea hebraica Bates, 1865
 Colobothea hirtipes (DeGeer, 1775)
 Colobothea hondurena Giesbert, 1979
 Colobothea humerosa Bates, 1865
 Colobothea juncea Bates, 1865
 Colobothea larriveei Galileo et al., 2014
 Colobothea lateralis Bates, 1865
 Colobothea leucophaea Bates, 1865
 Colobothea lineatocollis Bates, 1865
 Colobothea lucaria Bates, 1865
 Colobothea lunulata Lucas, 1859
 Colobothea macularis (Olivier, 1792)
 Colobothea maculicollis Bates, 1865
 Colobothea meleagrina Erichson, 1847
 Colobothea mimetica Aurivillius, 1902
 Colobothea mosaica Bates, 1865
 Colobothea musiva (Germar, 1824) 
 Colobothea naevia Bates, 1865
 Colobothea naevigera Bates, 1865
 Colobothea nigromaculata Zajciw, 1971
 Colobothea obconica Aurivillius, 1902
 Colobothea obtusa Bates, 1865
 Colobothea olivencia Bates, 1865
 Colobothea ordinata Bates, 1865
 Colobothea osculatii Guérin-Méneville, 1855
 Colobothea parcens Bates, 1881
 Colobothea passerina Erichson in Schomburg, 1848
 Colobothea paulina Bates, 1865
 Colobothea peruviana Aurivillius, 1920
 Colobothea pictilis Bates, 1865
 Colobothea picturata Monné, 1993
 Colobothea pimplaea Bates, 1865
 Colobothea plagiata Aurivillius, 1902
 Colobothea plebeja Aurivillius, 1902
 Colobothea pleuralis Casey, 1913
 Colobothea poecila (Germar, 1824)
 Colobothea propinqua Bates, 1865
 Colobothea pulchella Bates, 1865
 Colobothea punctata Aurivillius, 1902
 Colobothea pura Bates, 1865
 Colobothea ramosa Bates, 1872
 Colobothea regularis Bates, 1881
 Colobothea rincona Giesbert, 1979
 Colobothea roppai Monné, 1993
 Colobothea rubroornata Zajciw, 1962
 Colobothea sahlbergi Aurivillius, 1902
 Colobothea schmidti Bates, 1865
 Colobothea scolopacea Erichson, 1847
 Colobothea securifera Bates, 1865
 Colobothea sejuncta Bates, 1865
 Colobothea seminalis Bates, 1865
 Colobothea septemmaculata Zajciw, 1971
 Colobothea seriatomaculata Zajciw, 1962
 Colobothea sexagglomerata Zajciw, 1962
 Colobothea sexmaculata Aurivillius, 1902
 Colobothea sexualis Casey, 1913
 Colobothea signatipennis Lameere, 1884
 Colobothea signativentris Gahan, 1889
 Colobothea simillima Aurivillius, 1902
 Colobothea sinaloensis Giesbert, 1979
 Colobothea socia Gahan, 1889
 Colobothea sordida Aurivillius, 1902
 Colobothea strigosa Bates, 1865
 Colobothea styligera Bates, 1865
 Colobothea subcincta Laporte, 1840
 Colobothea sublunulata Zajciw, 1962
 Colobothea subtessellata Bates, 1865
 Colobothea unilineata Bates, 1872
 Colobothea varia (Fabricius, 1787)
 Colobothea varica Bates, 1865
 Colobothea vidua Bates, 1865
 Colobothea viehmanni Monné & Martins, 1979
 Colobothea wappesi Monné & Monné, 2010

References

 
Colobotheini